Gioja may refer to:

Gioja (crater), a lunar crater
Camillo Gioja Barbera, 19th-century Italian painter
César Gioja (born 1945), Argentine politician
Flavio Gioja (born c. 1300), probable Italian mariner and inventor
José Luis Gioja (born 1949), Argentine politician

See also
 Gioia (disambiguation)

de:Gioja
es:Gioja